Menno is a Dutch language given name of Old Frisian origin. It was made popular by the influential Frisian religious reformer Menno Simons (West Frisian: Minne Simens), and the name was spread by his followers, the Mennonites.

Menno is the Dutch version of Frisian Meine. Like other Germanic names with mein-, it stems from megin- "power, strength".

It can refer to:

People
 Menno Simons (1496–1561), founder of the Mennonites. 
 Menno van Coehoorn (1641–1704), Dutch soldier and military engineer.
 Menno ter Braak (1902–1940), Dutch modernist author. 
 Menno Sluijter (born 1932), Dutch anaesthetist.
 Menno Voorhof, pen name of Herman Koch (born 1953), Dutch writer and actor
 Menno Versteeg (born 1981), Dutch-Canadian musician and lead singer of Hollerado
 Menno Meyjes (born 1954), Dutch-born screenwriter, film director and producer
 Menno-Jan Kraak (born 1958), Dutch cartographer
 Menno Boelsma (born 1961), Dutch speed skater.
  (born 1963), Dutch harpsichordist and organist
 Menno Oosting (1964–1999) Dutch tennis player.
 Menno Schilthuizen (born 1965), Dutch evolutionary biologist and ecologist.
 Menno Westendorp (born 1969), Dutch cinematographer.
 Menno Veldhuis (born 1974), Dutch painter and photographer
 Menno Willems (born 1977), Dutch footballer.
  (born 1984), Dutch DJ and producer. 
 Menno Effern (born 1984), Dutch DungeonMaster for Dungeons and Dragons
 Menno Koch (born 1994), Dutch footballer.
 Menno Heus (born 1995), Dutch footballer.
 Menno Bergsen (born 1999), Dutch footballer.

References

Dutch masculine given names